Parornix peregrinaella is a moth of the family Gracillariidae. It is known from Canada (Nova Scotia and Québec) and the United States (New Jersey and Vermont).

The larvae feed on Comptonia peregrina. They mine the leaves of their host plant.

References

Parornix
Moths of North America
Moths described in 1949